Sepia esculenta, the golden cuttlefish, is a cuttlefish ranging from the Russian seas to the Philippines and throughout the western Pacific. This species of cuttlefish is a nektobenthic organism living with a range of depths between 10m-150m(33 ft-492 ft) but is primarily found within the shallow, coastal waters from japan to the Philippines at a depth between 10m-100m. Members of this species are roughly 18 cm in length.

Life cycle
The life span of the golden cuttlefish is typically short and around 1 year. After maturity, males perform different visual displays to attract a potential mate to sexually reproduce. These members of the Cephalopoda class are gonochoric, meaning reproductive organs are separate between males and females. Males carry sperm and females carry eggs. In cuttlefish, to carry out mating, males pass a packet of sperm using one of their arms specially adapted for this purpose to the females buccal membrane. Golden Cuttlefish male sperm competition plays a large role in reproduction. Females often mate with more than one male during each mating season and retain sperm in storage for a long time. This leads to male competition to mate and eventually sperm competition to fertilize the eggs. Golden cuttlefish males use their arms to scrape the packets of sperm from other males off the buccal membrane, in an effort to remove as much as possible before adding their own. Once completed, the female golden cuttlefish will lay clusters of eggs at a pace of one egg roughly every 5 minutes on seaweeds, grasses, branches, etc. Batches consist of 50-300 eggs for roughly 3-4 followed by a day of rest. This patterns continues until thousands of eggs have been laid. Once mating is complete, golden cuttlefish return to the sea. When the eggs are hatched, golden cuttlefish start out in a planktonic stage for a period of time before growing larger and taking up a benthic lifestyle.

References

Wikipedia Student Program
Molluscs described in 1885
Cuttlefish